A bench jeweler is an artisan who uses a combination of skills to make and repair jewelry. Some of the more common skills that a bench jeweler might employ include antique restoration, silversmith, Goldsmith, stone setting, engraving, fabrication, wax carving, lost-wax casting, electroplating, forging, and polishing.

Jewelry manufacture 

In general, an original design is made and sold using processes such as molding, casting, stamping and similar techniques. The other is original, one of a kind work. The bench jeweler will be a factor in many facets of the process, depending on what is needed and the skills of the worker.

When a production piece is contemplated, it may go through a design process that can range from one person with an idea to a full-scale planning stage involving teams of artists and marketing professionals. Eventually, that design will need to be made into a real piece of metal jewelry, which is generally called a model, and the worker who makes it is generally the model maker. This is often considered the highest form of craftsmanship, as the piece must be made true to the design and also to most exacting standards. A good model maker is, along with a fine watchmaker, among the most technically skilled workers in any trade. After the model is made and found to be what is desired, it is molded or perhaps entered into a machining process to make copies. Assuming it is molded, multiples of the piece are cast from the mold. See lost-wax casting, which article has a sculptural inclination, though the principles are the same for jewelry casting. The cast pieces will likely need a variety of work done to them, including filing to remove the skin left from casting and prepare for polishing, straightening parts, rounding and sizing rings, and assembling many various parts together using solder. Although the method used is called soldering, it is actually a form of brazing, using "solders" of the metal being worked, i.e. gold solders for gold pieces, silver solder for silver pieces, etc.  All of this is the work of bench jewelers, who at this level are sometimes known as production workers in some arenas. In this context, the bench jeweler (often known simply as a goldsmith) is responsible for all of the main work involved in turning a raw casting into a piece of jewelry - filing it, straightening it, assembling parts or adding settings for stones, repairing any problems that might have occurred, and preparing it for stone setting and polishing.

Special-order jewelry 

Special-order jewelry is the making of one of a kind items and is not too different from model making. The Main difference between the two is that the special-order piece is made in precious materials, while often a model is not, and the need for exacting precision is nowhere near as high as in model making. Generally, the special order jewelers take a design, either their own or a customer's, and turn it into a piece of finished jewelry from start to finish. This process, like model making, can be fairly simple Wax Carving to be cast into metal, or it can involve very complex fabrication skills building the piece out of the actual metal using a wide variety of skills and tools. Very often both model making and special order involve gemstones, and thus the pieces must be designed and made to properly hold those.

Anatomy of a jewelry shop 

It will be obvious that any manufacturer of any product will design a workshop to one's own liking and it may defy convention. There are, however, some typical categories that most shops in the jewelry trade will employ. If it is a manufacturing workshop, likely it will begin with the casting room, then to the bench jewelers or goldsmiths, perhaps to the polishing department and maybe to stonesetting.  Generally, there will be at least one model maker, who may also do special orders, or there may be a dedicated special order department and sometimes even repair, depending on the size of the shop. Usually, there is also at least one foreman and also a front office handling management. In addition, there might be engravers, enlistments, perhaps a machine shop and others, depending on the product being made. A good shop behaves as a team, each department doing its part and the work passing back and forth between them as needed.  In this situation, each one is a specialist at one's job, and though they all may have a broader background that becomes useful at times, they generally will not enter into another department's expertise. Each department also recognizes the worker's abilities, so that there may be ten workers called "goldsmiths", but one will have simple skills, and another may have greatly higher ability, and so the more or less challenging jobs are assigned accordingly.

A bench jeweler 

Although the term bench jeweler is a contemporary term with vague meaning, it often is used to describe a jeweler who has a larger set of skills than that of a production worker who merely files and solders rings. Thus they may have a fair knowledge of stone setting, a bit of engraving, and perhaps other skills that widen their abilities. For a long time throughout history the model was as described above under "Anatomy of a Jewelry Shop", with a fairly strict delineation of responsibilities. In the modern day, there are a great many jewelers who do it all, from design to stone setting to finishing with fair ability.  Whether it is used in one context or another, there is no doubt that the bench jeweler is the jewelry worker who does the major metal work and the brazing, and its meaning can also be taken more widely to mean one who is more versatile in the trade than merely an assembler of parts.  The term can and has been used to describe any of the work described above - model making, special order, repair, assembly, and more, though it is probably becoming a term to describe an all-around jeweler more and more in recent years.

References

See also
 Jewelers' Row
 Goldsmith
 Silversmith
 Lost-wax casting

 
Jewellers